Beijing Peking University Unity Microsystems Technology Co., Ltd (or PKUnity) is a Beijing-based Chinese high-tech enterprise engaged in home-grown CPU (Central Processing Unit) development and system design.

History
PKUnity grew from the Peking University's Microprocessor R&D Center and was founded in November 2002.. With a series of significant in R&D and the commercialization of home-grown CPU development in recent years, the company has been recognized as one of the pioneers and leaders in microprocessor design in China.

External links
Company website

Companies based in Beijing